The Queen of Trinidad is a studio album from Tobagonian Calypso singer/songwriter, Calypso Rose, released by Maturity Productions/VPAL on June 19, 2012.

The album features Calypso, Soca, Blues and the melodies and rhythms of Africa and Central America appealingly. 
 
This album also includes a DVD: Calypso Rose, The Lioness of The Jungle, a documentary film by Pascale Obolo. The film shows her personal story, musical achievements, her beliefs and obligation to women's rights while travelling from Trinidad and Tobago to New York, Paris, and Africa.

She received more than twenty-five awards and honors in the West Indies and outside of the Caribbean countries.

Track listing

References

External links
 THE-QUEEN-OF-TRINIDAD-CALYPSO-ROSE-p/mmlvp50101.2.htm vpreggae.com

2012 albums
Calypso Rose albums